Martin de Bervanger (May 15, 1795 – 1865) was a French priest, founder of charitable institutions including the Parisian Institution Saint-Nicolas. He was born in Sarrelouis, and died in Paris.

Life

After being for some time assistant pastor in his native city, he took part, in 1822, in the foundation of the Association Royale de Saint-Joseph, and later of the Œuvre de Saint-Henri. These two institutions were destined to give to workingmen free instruction and professional training. To reach this end more effectively, he founded, in 1827, a boarding-school where, besides manual training, poor boys could receive intellectual, religious, and moral education. This is the Œuvre de Saint-Nicolas.

In the beginning only seven children were in the establishment, but it soon developed and was transferred from its  poor quarters in the Faubourg Saint-Marceau, to a better location in the Rue Vaugirard. At the time of the Revolution of 1830, the first two institutions disappeared, but the Institution Saint-Nicolas remained. It had many difficulties to overcome; the resources were insufficient; proper instructors could not always be found; suspicions of political intrigues were entertained by the Government, which led to various vexatious inquiries. De Bervanger succeeded in overcoming all obstacles, and the institution became more and more prosperous. Soon a branch establishment was founded at Issy.

In 1859 De Bervanger turned over the institution to Cardinal Morlot, Archbishop of Paris, who gave the direction of it to the Christian Brothers. It has since been enlarged. De Bervanger wrote the Règle de l'Œuvre de Saint Nicolas (1853).

References

1795 births
1865 deaths
19th-century French Roman Catholic priests